Nathan Outlaw (born March 1978) is an English professional chef who has worked previously with television chef Rick Stein. He now runs his two Michelin star restaurant, Restaurant Nathan Outlaw, in Port Isaac, Cornwall. He has appeared on television shows such as BBC's Great British Menu and Saturday Kitchen.

Early life
At the age of fourteen, he began working with his father, who was a chef. Outlaw's first job was buttering toast at his father's restaurant at age eight. He trained as a chef for two years at Thanet College in Broadstairs, doing a National Vocational Qualification level 2 in Food Preparation.

Career
Outlaw's first job as a chef was with Peter Kromberg at the InterContinental London Park Lane in London. Positions alongside chefs Gary Rhodes and Eric Chavot followed. Between 1998 and 2000 he worked with chefs Rick Stein and Paul Ripley in Padstow, Cornwall. Stein and Outlaw have remained friends ever since. He went on to work at the two Michelin starred restaurant Lords of the Manor with head chef John Campbell.

In May 2003 he opened his first restaurant Black Pig, with his philosophy of cooking with quality ingredients from small producers and farmers around Britain, and developing them into dishes with modern and contemporary stle. He was awarded his first Michelin star in the following January at the age of 28. In 2006, he took over the restaurant at the Marina Villa in Fowey, Cornwall, opening his Restaurant Nathan Outlaw in 2007.

In 2009 The Good Food Guide included Outlaw's restaurant at the eleventh position, and described the chef as making "discreet but powerful waves" in the industry. He opened his second restaurant, the Nathan Outlaw Seafood Bar and Grill, at the St Enodoc hotel in Rock, Cornwall, in May during the same year.

The 2010 Good Food Guide saw his restaurant move up one place and into the top ten for the first time, with Outlaw described as a "wizard". During the same year, he also competed in BBC's Great British Menu. Outlaw supported the Cornwall Fire and Rescue Service's campaign to prevent cooking related fires at Christmas. The 2011 Michelin Guide awarded Nathan his second star at his restaurant. It remains the only specialised fish restaurant in the UK to hold any Michelin stars. Outlaw has also appeared on the television show Saturday Kitchen.

2012 saw the launch of Outlaw's first cookbook.

Personal life
Outlaw met his wife Rachel while he was working with Rick Stein. She was one of the front of house staff. They have two children together, one of which is called Jacob. Outlaw has a collection of several hundred stuffed parrots, mostly located in his front room.

References

External links

Living people
1978 births
English chefs
English television chefs
Head chefs of Michelin starred restaurants